Avni Klinaku is a Kosovar Albanian politician and nationalist.

Biography
Avni Klinaku was born on March 25, 1965, in the village of Mazgit, Obiliq, SFR Yugoslavia. He finished the "Miladin Popović" (now "Gjin Gazulli") technical high school in Pristina.

His political career started in 1982, as a People's Movement of Kosovo member, until 1984. He was arrested in 1984 by Yugoslavian authorities and imprisoned till 1989. In 1993, he co-founded NMLK, and was its leader until 1997, before getting arrested again and imprisoned until 2001.
Since 2007, he has served as the leader of the Movement for Unification (Albanian: Lëvizja për Bashkim, LB), a nationalist party in Kosovo, opposing the Ahtisaari Plan and seeking reunification with Albania; he is currently in his second term.

See also
Movement for Unification
National Movement for the Liberation of Kosovo
Albanians in Kosovo
Albanian nationalism
List of political parties in Kosovo

Notes and references

Notes

References

External links
Movement for Unification - Official website

1965 births
Albanian nationalists in Kosovo
Living people
Politicians from Vushtrri
20th-century Albanian politicians
21st-century Albanian politicians
Kosovo Albanians
Albanian rights activists
Yugoslav Albanians